Florence Kenyon Hayden Rector (1882–1973) is known as the first licensed female architect in the state of Ohio, entering Ohio State University in 1901. She was also the only female architect practicing in central Ohio between 1900 and 1930. She never completed her degree but finished at least two years, still becoming a successful architect. She was born in 1882 in St. Louis, and died on May 19, 1973, in Columbus. Even without her degree Rector was employed teaching architecture at Ohio State from 1905 to 1907.

Oxley Hall

Her first design was of the first women's dormitory on the campus, and it was completed in 1908. It is called Oxley Hall and is a three-story building constructed of brick and features an octagonal tower. It was built in the English Renaissance style with a Spanish tile roof, brick exterior and limestone trim. The cost of the original structure is listed as $66,490.85.

Rector had studied with then-Ohio State University architect Joseph Bradford. Her work was so good that Bradford suggested her to the board of trustees as the architect for the first women’s dorm on campus. She was 25 years old. She got the job, although the trustees assigned her a male partner, Wilbur T. Mills.

In a 1970 Columbus Dispatch interview, Rector said that she became fed up with Mills, locked him out of the office, and submitted her final plans for approval within the month. So what we see today is Florence Kenyon Hayden Rector’s vision, although both she and Mills are listed as the official architectural team.

Residents moved into the building in September 1908 and took a vote on what to name their new home. The board of trustees accepted their recommendation, and on November 20, 1908, officially named the building for university president William Oxley Thompson's mother (her maiden name, which is where he got his middle name).

The building served as a dormitory until 1967, when it was decided that it was unsuitable as a residence hall and was leased to the University Research Foundation. The building was remodeled in 1989, and in 1991 the Department of International Affairs moved in, where it remains to this day.

Other designs

In 1910, she married James M. Rector, a prominent Columbus physician, and continued her architectural practice throughout her life. After marrying, she began designing medical facilities, for which she later gained some national attention. Early in her career, Rector assisted her uncle, L. Howard Hayden, in designing the seating plan for Madison Square Garden in New York City.

Another design of Rector's is an arts and crafts style house that was built at 1277 East Broad Street in Columbus. She also designed her personal residence constructed in 1926 at 878 Franklin Avenue in Columbus, where she lived until her death. The long, narrow home she designed for herself is a stuccoed two-and-a-half story structure. With its gable end to the street, the house is modest and has an asymmetrical front facade. It combines French doors, small rectangular windows, round-headed windows, and steel casements in an eclectic and very personal design.

In addition, she was the architect for the Wolfe's Journal Island Cottage; a doctor's office building at State & Sixth Street (since demolished) in Columbus and homes in the Woodland Park Neighborhood of Columbus, Ohio.

Suffragist activities
Rector also maintained an active political life as well, serving as an active suffragist and as the Financial Chairwoman of the National Woman's Party in 1921.

Family

Her sister, Dr. Gillette Hayden, was a pioneering dentist and periodontist in the early 20th century and a founder of the American Academy of Periodontology.  Rector's great-grandfather was Dr. Horace H. Hayden, a dentist in the early part of the 19th century.  In 1840, Dr. Horace H. Hayden was one of the two founders of the first chartered dental college in the world, the Baltimore School of Dental Surgery, now known as the Dental College of the University of Maryland.

Writings
"Women Awake!", 24pp., c.a. 1920, Kenyon Hayden Rector Papers, Ohio Historical Society.

Papers
The Ohio Historical Society in Columbus, Ohio, houses Florence Kenyon Hayden Rector's papers dating from 1893-1934 while The International Archive of Women in Architecture at Virginia Tech in Blacksburg, Virginia, houses some of her papers dating between 1905 and 1907.

References

The First American Women Architects by Sarah Allaback
A Place of Their Own: Oxley Hall, The First Woman's Dorm, Ohio State University, University Libraries Blog
Ohio State University, Knowlton School of Architecture, Digital Library

1882 births
1973 deaths
20th-century American architects
Ohio State University people
Ohio State University alumni
American women architects
20th-century American women